Jordi Garcia Fernàndez (born 22 November 1963, Barcelona) is a biologist whose research focuses on how the novelties present in the key evolutionary transitions arouse during metazoan evolution. He is the current vice-rector of research at the University of Barcelona, and a Honorary Research Professor at the University of Oxford.

Life and career 
After finishing his grade studies, in 1992 he published his doctoral thesis under the supervision of Emili Saló i Boix in the University of Barcelona. Then he moved to Oxford for his Postdoctoral research to the lab of Peter Holland. In 1998, he published his research about the ParaHox gene cluster in a Nature paper with Peter Holland and Nina Brooke.
In the year 2000, Jordi Garcia refused leading the European amphioxus genome project due to the poor state of research in Spain. In 2003 he obtained the position of full professor of genetics and in 2007 he was awarded the Honorary Research Professor of Merton College position (Oxford). After being elected as Head of Genetics Department in the University of Barcelona in 2015 and (after the departments fusion) of the Genetics, Microbiology and Statistics Department of the University of Barcelona in 2016, he became vice-rector of research of the University of Barcelona after the team led by Joan Guardia won the elections in December 2020. Alongside his career he has stablished long-term (national and international) collaborations such as with Peter Holland (Oxford), Manuel Irimia (Barcelona), Hector Escrivá (Banyuls-sur-mer) o Jaime Carvajal (Sevilla).

Prizes and Awards 
 ICREA Academia, Generalitat de Catalunya, 2010
 Merton College Honorary Research Professor, desde 2007
 National habilitation to Full Professorships in Genetics, first call, 2003
 Distinction of the Generalitat de Catalunya for the promotion of University Research, proposed by Edward Lewis and Peter Holland, 2002
 Nominated for the prizes of the Human Frontiers organization, category postdoc, 1999
 Extraordinari Doctoral prize 1992/1993

Scientific Societies 
 Member of the council, Sociedad Española de Biología del Desarrollo, 2007-2016
 Member of the council, Sociedad Española de Biología Evolutiva, 2009–present
 Member of the council, Sociedad Española de Genética, 1998-2002
 Coordinator of the Developmental Biology Section of the Societat Catalana de Biologia (1998-2015)
 National Representative and council member of the European Society of Evolution and Development, 2007-2012

Selected publications 
The complete list of publications is available at https://webgrec.ub.edu/webpages/personal/ang/004348_jordigarcia.ub.edu.html
 Navas-Pérez, E.; Vicente-Garcia, C.; Mirra, S.; Burguera, D., Fernàndez-Castillo, N.; Ferrán, J.L.; López-Mayorga, M.; Alaiz-Noya, M.; Suárez-Pereira, I.; Antón-Galindo, E.; Ulloa, F.; Herrera-Úbeda, C.; Cuscó, P.; Falcón-Moya, R.; Rodríguez-Moreno, A.; D'Aniello, S.; Cormand, B.; Marfany, G.; Soriano, E.; Carrión, A.M.; Carvajal, J.J.; Garcia-Fernàndez, J. (2020). Characterisation of a eutherian gene cluster generated after transposon domestication identifies Bex3 as relevant for advanced neurological functions. Genome Biology . 
 Herrera-Úbeda, C.; Martin-Barba, M.; Navas-Pérez, E.; Gravemeyer, J.; Albuixech-Crespo, B.; Wheeler, G.N.; Lizcano, JM.; Garcia-Fernàndez, J. (2019). Microsyntenic clusters reveal conservation of lncRNAs in Chordates despite absence of sequence Conservation. Biology, 8(3), p. 61 . Repositori Institucional . 
 Zhong, Y., Herrera-Úbeda, C., Garcia-Fernàndez, J. et al. Mutation of amphioxus Pdx and Cdx demonstrates conserved roles for ParaHox genes in gut, anus and tail patterning. BMC Biol 18, 68 (2020). 
 Irimia, M.; Denuc, A.; Burguera, D.; Somorjai, I.; Martín-Durán, J.; Genikovich, G.; Jiménez-Delgado, S.; Technau, U.; Roy, S.; Marfany, G.; Garcia-Fernàndez, J. (2011). Stepwise assembly of the nova-regulated alternative splicing network in the vertebrate brain. Proceedings of the National Academy of Sciences of the United States of America - PNAS, 108, pp. 5319 – 5324 . 
 Putnam, N.; Butts, T.; Ferrier, D.E.K.; Furlong, R.F.; Hellsten, U.; Kawashima, T.; Robinson-Rechavi, M.; Shoguchi, E.; Terry, A.; Yu, J.K.; Benito-Gutiérrez, E.; Dubchak, I.; Garcia-Fernàndez, J.; Grigoriev, I.V.; Horton, A.V.; de Jong, P.J.; Jurka, J.; Kapitonov, V.; Kohara, Y.; Kuroki, Y.; Lindquist, E.; Lucas, S.; Osoegawa, K.; Pennachio, L.A.; Asaf Salamov, A.; Satou, Y.; Sauka-Spengler, T.; Schmutz, T.; Shin-I, T.; Toyoda, A.; Gibson-Brown, J.J.; Bronner-Fraser, M.; Fujiyama, M.; Holland, L.Z.; Holland, P.W.H.; Satoh, N.; Rokhsar, D.S. (2008). The amphiouxs genome and the evolution of the chordate karyotype. Nature, 453, pp. 1064 – 1071 . 
 Garcia-Fernàndez, J. (2005). The genesis and evolution of homeobox gene clusters. Nature Reviews Genetics, 6, pp. 881 – 892 . 
 Brooke, N.M.; Garcia-Fernandez, J.; Holland, P.W.H. (1998). The ParaHox gene cluster is an evolutionary sister of the Hox gene cluster. Nature, 392, pp. 920 – 922 . 
 García-Fernández, J.; Marfany, G.; Baguñà, J.; Saló, E. (1993). Infiltration of mariner elements. Nature, 364(8), pp. 109 – 110 .

Books 
Garcia-Fernàndez,J.; Bueno, D. (2019). El embrión inconformista. Cómo influye en nuestra evolución el desarrollo embrionario . (pp. 1 – 200) . Universitat de Barcelona .  . fitxa
Garcia-Fernàndez, J.; Bueno D. (2016). L'embrió inconformista: Com influeix en la nostra evolució el desenvolupament embrionari . (pp. 1 – 181) . Edicions Universitat de Barcelona (UBe) / Ominscellula .  .
Bueno, D.; Parvas, M.; Hermelo,.I; Garcia-Fernàndez, J. (2016). Embryonic blood-cerebrospinal fluid barrier formation and function . En Ontogeny and Phylogeny of Brain Barrier Mechanisms . (pp. 42 – 53) . Frontiers Media .  . ebook pdf
García-Fernàndez, J; Benito-Gutiérrez, E. (2011). El petit amfiox: el miratge de l'origen dels vertebratsOrganismes model en Biologia. Treballs de la Societat Catalana de Biologia . En Organismes model en Biologia. Treballs de la Societat Catalana de Biologia . Volum. 62 . (pp. 131 – 139) . Societat Catalana de Biologia .
Garcia-Fernàndez, J. (2000). La biologia del desenvolupament . En La Biologia a l'alba d'un nou mil.leni. Treballs de la Societat Catalana de Biologia . Volum. 50 . (pp. 213 – 223) . Societat Catalana de Biologia .

References 

Spanish scientists
1963 births
Living people
University of Barcelona alumni
Academic staff of the University of Barcelona
Fellows of Merton College, Oxford
20th-century Spanish scientists
21st-century Spanish scientists